Coiner is a surname. Notable people with the surname include:

Charles Coiner (born 1943), former Idaho state senator
Charles T. Coiner (1898-1989), American painter and advertising art director
Charlie Coiner, American college football coach
Ryan Coiner (born 1979), American retired soccer forward

See also
Camp Coiner, a United States Forces Korea installation in Seoul, South Korea
Coining (disambiguation)